Pettisville High School is a public high school in Pettisville, Ohio.  It is the only high school in the Pettisville Local Schools district.  Their nickname is the Blackbirds.  They are members of the Buckeye Border Conference. Pettisville Local Schools, located 30 miles west of Toledo in Fulton County, Ohio is a unique school district in terms of Ohio education today. The district, one of the smaller districts in the state, enjoys an almost unduplicated level of public support. Pettisville is a school of “choice” in that it ranks in the top fifteen districts statewide in percentage of students who “choose” schools. About one in three students come to Pettisville from other Ohio school districts through the provisions of open enrollment.

Ohio High School Athletic Association State Championships

 Boys Track and Field – 1991

References

External links
 District Website

High schools in Fulton County, Ohio
Public high schools in Ohio